Live at the Olympic: The Last DJ is a live DVD by American musician rock band Tom Petty and the Heartbreakers, first released in September 2003 (see 2003 in music). The film features the band's 2002 album The Last DJ performed in its entirety. Also featured are several of the band's other songs, and "You Wreck Me" from Petty's 1994 solo album Wildflowers. It was directed by Martyn Atkins.

The DVD package includes a Bonus CD containing four covers, recorded for the PBS program Soundstage.

DVD listing
"The Last DJ"
"Money Becomes King"
"Dreamville"
"Joe"
"When a Kid Goes Bad"
"Like a Diamond"
"Lost Children"
"Blue Sunday"
"You and Me"
"The Man Who Loves Women"
"Have Love Will Travel"
"Can't Stop the Sun"
"Change of Heart"
"I Need to Know"
"Shake, Rattle and Roll" (Charles E. Calhoun)
"Around and Around" (Chuck Berry)
"Mary Jane's Last Dance"
"You Wreck Me"

Bonus CD: Bad Girl Boogie
"I'm Crying" (Alan Price, Eric Burdon) – 4:17
"Done Somebody Wrong" (Elmore James) – 4:07
"I Got a Woman" (Ray Charles) – 3:01
"Carol" (Chuck Berry) – 5:29

Personnel
Tom Petty and the Heartbreakers

 Tom Petty - lead vocals, lead & rhythm guitar
 Mike Campbell - lead guitar
 Benmont Tench - piano, organ, synthesizer, backing vocals
 Ron Blair - bass, backing vocals
 Scott Thurston - rhythm guitar, synthesizer, lap steel guitar, ukulele, backing vocals
 Steve Ferrone - drums, percussion

Additional musicians 
Jon Brion – conductor
 The Big Money Orchestra - strings, horns

External links
Tom Petty & The Heartbreakers - official website

Tom Petty live albums
Live video albums
2003 video albums
2003 live albums
Tom Petty video albums
Warner Records video albums
Warner Records live albums